The fourth season of the animated television series BoJack Horseman premiered exclusively via Netflix's web streaming service on September 8, 2017.

Cast

Main
Will Arnett as BoJack Horseman and Butterscotch Horseman
Amy Sedaris as Princess Carolyn
Alison Brie as Diane Nguyen
Paul F. Tompkins as Mr. Peanutbutter
Aaron Paul as Todd Chavez

Recurring

Guest stars

Episodes

Reception
The fourth season of the show received critical acclaim; the review aggregator Rotten Tomatoes gave the season an approval rating of 97%, based on 29 reviews. The site's critical consensus states, "BoJack Horseman fourth season finds the show continuing to traverse the emotional gamut - with results that are heartbreaking as often as they are hilarious."  On Metacritic, the season has a score of 87 out of 100, based on 5 reviews, indicating "universal acclaim". IndieWire gave the season an A grade, commenting that "by the end of the season, we know these characters, and this show, far better than ever before. BoJack's signature tropes — the background visual jokes, the animal puns, the brutal moments of sadness — remain reliably consistent, but turns the focus largely inward, ensuring that some of the more outlandish plots support and highlight the more emotional storylines". The Washington Post lauded the season, praising the installment as "moving and unexpected" and that "it offers hope but never ignores the sorrows that are inevitable in real life". The New York Times also gave a positive review, commenting that the "material has the snap and the poignancy we've grown accustomed to" and that "while nothing matches the adventurousness of Season 3's underwater awards show episode, Season 4's ninth episode — narrated from the future by a distant descendant of Carolyn's — is a devastating example of what BoJack can do at its best".

References

2017 American television seasons
BoJack Horseman seasons